Bitlidzha (also, Bartsrashen) was a town in the Yerevan Province of Armenia; it is now in ruins.

References 

Populated places in Yerevan